Scarlet Band was a bus operator based in County Durham, UK.

History 
The firm was established by Sidney Blenkinsop in 1921 and was initially a taxi operator before it started running bus services in 1925. The firm operated buses in the UK and overseas, at one point 90% of its operations were outside the UK. Scarlet Band closed in October 2022 with its owner citing staff and vehicle parts shortages, increasing costs, and the loss of two major contracts (including that for Durham Park and Ride).

References 

Former bus operators in England
1921 establishments in England
2022 disestablishments in England
Transport in County Durham